Grądy may refer to the following places:
Grądy, Sieradz County in Łódź Voivodeship (central Poland)
Grądy, Łomża County in Podlaskie Voivodeship (north-east Poland)
Grądy, Mońki County in Podlaskie Voivodeship (north-east Poland)
Grądy, Wieruszów County in Łódź Voivodeship (central Poland)
Grądy, Opole Lubelskie County in Lublin Voivodeship (east Poland)
Grądy, Lesser Poland Voivodeship (south Poland)
Grądy, Grodzisk Mazowiecki County in Masovian Voivodeship (east-central Poland)
Grądy, Maków County in Masovian Voivodeship (east-central Poland)
Grądy, Gmina Małkinia Górna in Masovian Voivodeship (east-central Poland)
Grądy, Gmina Wąsewo in Masovian Voivodeship (east-central Poland)
Grądy, Sierpc County in Masovian Voivodeship (east-central Poland)
Grądy, Sokołów County in Masovian Voivodeship (east-central Poland)
Grądy, Warsaw West County in Masovian Voivodeship (east-central Poland)
Grądy, Konin County in Greater Poland Voivodeship (west-central Poland)
Grądy, Koło County in Greater Poland Voivodeship (west-central Poland)
Grądy, Opole Voivodeship (south-west Poland)
Grądy, Działdowo County in Warmian-Masurian Voivodeship (north Poland)
Grądy, Pisz County in Warmian-Masurian Voivodeship (north Poland)
Grądy, Szczytno County in Warmian-Masurian Voivodeship (north Poland)
Grądy, West Pomeranian Voivodeship (north-west Poland)